The Oldhaven Formation is a geologic formation in England, outcropping near Herne Bay, Kent. According to Philip Hadland, it preserves finely preserved fossils, such as those belonging to birds, fishes, snakes and turtles, dating back to the Eocene epoch (Ypresian).

See also

 List of fossiliferous stratigraphic units in England

References
 

Paleogene England